The Sauber C17 was the car with which the Sauber Formula One team competed in the 1998 Formula One season.  It was driven by Jean Alesi, who joined from Benetton, and Johnny Herbert, who was in his third season with the team after an impressive 1997 season.

1998 confirmed Sauber's position as a respectable midfield runner unable to make the final breakthrough needed to become a top team.  The team's package was quick and reliable, but not quite enough to regularly score points.  Indeed, Alesi and Herbert finished just outside the points, in seventh, no less than five times.  The highlight of the year was Alesi's run to third at the 1998 Belgian Grand Prix to score the team's fourth podium since their F1 début in 1993.  This capped an encouraging season for the Frenchman, who was duly kept on for another year.  Herbert, despite a points finish in the first race of the season, lost his motivation after a sequence of bad luck and narrowly missing out on further points.  He decided to move to Stewart for 1999, and would be replaced by Pedro Diniz.

The team eventually finished sixth in the Constructors' Championship with ten points.  This was their best WCC position so far, but there was still some way to go to take on the likes of Ferrari and McLaren.

It was with this car that the last round steering wheel in Formula 1 was used. All steering wheels have been rectangular since then.

For the first few races, X-wings were used, but they were banned after the San Marino Grand Prix.

Complete Formula One results
(key) (results in bold indicate pole position)

References
AUTOCOURSE 1998-99, Henry, Alan (ed.), Hazleton Publishing Ltd. (1998) 

C17
1998 Formula One season cars